Pablo Corral Embade (born January 25, 1972, in A Coruña) is a vision impaired B2/S12 swimmer from Spain.  He competed at the 1996 Summer Paralympics, winning a silver in the 50 meter freestyle.

References

External links 
 
 

1972 births
Living people
Spanish male backstroke swimmers
Spanish male freestyle swimmers
Paralympic swimmers of Spain
Paralympic silver medalists for Spain
Swimmers at the 1996 Summer Paralympics
Medalists at the 1996 Summer Paralympics
Sportspeople from A Coruña
Medalists at the 1988 Summer Paralympics
Medalists at the 1992 Summer Paralympics
Paralympic medalists in swimming